Laach Castle is the name of the following castles in Germany:

 Laach Castle (Kruft) in the county of Mayen-Koblenz
 Laach Castle (Thorr) in Thorr, Rhein-Erft-Kreis